The Malankara Mar Thoma Syrian Church, often shortened to Mar Thoma Church, and known also as the Reformed Syrian Church and the Mar Thoma Syrian Church of Malabar, is an autonomous Reformed Oriental church based in Kerala, India. While continuing many of the Syriac high church practices, the church is reformed in its theology and doctrines. It employs a reformed variant of the West Syriac Rite Divine Liturgy of Saint James, translated to Malayalam.

The Mar Thoma Church sees itself as continuation of the Saint Thomas Christians, a community traditionally believed to have been founded in the first century by Thomas the Apostle, who is known as Mar Thoma (Saint Thomas) in Syriac, and describes itself as "Apostolic in origin, Universal in nature, Biblical in faith, Evangelical in principle, Ecumenical in outlook, Oriental in worship, Democratic in function, and Episcopal in character".

Until the beginning of the 20th century, Mar Thoma Christians lived in a few districts of Central Travancore (Pathanamthitta, Kollam, and Thiruvananthapuram districts) and Kunnamkulam (Thrissur district) in Kerala. Since that time they have spread with the 20th-century Indian diaspora to North America, Europe, the Middle East, Malaysia, Singapore, South Africa, Australia and New Zealand. According to the figures provided by the church itself, it currently has over 1 million members. Their mother tongue is Malayalam, the language of Kerala, and historically the variety known as Suriyani Malayalam was associated with them.

According to the 2011 Census of Kerala it was, with a membership of 405,089, the sixth largest Christian church in the state, coming after the Syro-Malabar Catholic Church (2,345,911), the Latin Catholic Church (932,733), the Malankara Orthodox Syrian Church (493,858), the Jacobite Syrian Christian Church (482,762), and the Syro-Malankara Catholic Church (465,207).

Definitions
Malankara Mar Thoma Syrian Church is commonly called the Mar Thoma Church. In official and legal records the church is referred to as Mar Thoma Syrian Church of Malabar or as Malankara Mar Thoma Syrian Church. Malabar is a term used to denote the Kerala coast in earlier days. The original Church was referred to as the Church of Malabar by the Jesuits and as the Syrian Church of Malabar in Missionary Registers from 1801 onward. Malankara is an ancient name derived from the name 'Maliankara', Maliankara Island is on the Southwestern side of the Indian Peninsula. It is between Gokarnam and Kanyakumari the southernmost point of India. Kerala, the present southwestern state of India is only a part of Malankara. It is also thought to be a cognate of this name Maliankara, a place near Muziris, where Thomas the Apostle first landed in Kerala.

Mar Thoma is Aramaic, and means Saint Thomas. Members of the Mar Thoma Syrian Church are commonly called as Mar Thomiyar, Mar Thomites, or Mar Thoma Syrians. The original liturgical language used by Saint Thomas Christians was the East Syriac language which is a variant of Aramaic. The Reformation movement in the Malankara Syrian Church later resulted in the evolution of an independent indigenous Malankara church under the Mathoma Metropolitan, breaking all the ecclesiastical and temporal control from outside Malankara.  In 1898, during the reign of Titus I Mar Thoma the church accepted as its name, Malankara Mar Thoma Syrian Church or Mar Thoma Syrian Church of Malabar to comprise its order and heritage. The members of this church are known as Mar Thoma Nasrani or Mar Thoma Syrian Nasrani.

Administration
The Mar Thoma Syrian Church has a well-defined constitution and has a democratic pattern of administration. The central administrative setup consists of the Metropolitan, the Episcopal Synod (Consisting of all the Bishops of the Church), the Prathinithi Mandalam (House of Representatives) and the Sabha Council (Executive body of the house of representatives / Mandalam), and the Vaideeka Selection Committee (to select candidates for the ordained ministry of the church).

The Central Administration of the Church is backed by the Dioceses. Each diocese has its own council and an assembly. The assembly members are elected by the individual parishes, and the diocesan council members are elected by the assembly.

All members of a parish are members of the Edavaka Sangham (General Body) and they also have the right to elect their representatives to the Diocesan Assembly and Prathinidhi Mandalam (Church Parliament).

The title of the head of the Church is "Mar Thoma Metropolitan". He is ordained from among the duly-consecrated bishops (Episcopas) of the Church, the choice being ordinarily that of the senior-most among them. The present Mar Thoma Metropolitan is Theodosius Mar Thoma who resides at Poolatheen at Church Headquarters in Tiruvalla, Kerala. He is 21 Mar Thoma in the line of continuation after the re-establishment of the Mar Thoma episcopacy after the Oath of the Koonan Cross (1653).

If the Metropolitan is personally satisfied that he has difficulty continuing to perform the duties pertaining to his office, he may relinquish the powers and responsibilities of Metropolitan. Then he becomes the Mar Thoma Metropolitan Emeritus and is addressed as "Mar Thoma Valiya Metropolitan". The present "Mar Thoma Valiya Metropolitan is Philipose Chrysostom Mar Thoma Valiya Metropolitan.

To assist the metropolitan there are Episcopas, the senior-most among them is called the Suffragan Metropolitan.

Administrative divisions
For administrative purposes, the Malankara Mar Thoma Syrian Church is divided into 13 dioceses or popularly called 'Bhadhrasanams' (Mal  ഭദ്രാസനം) headed by a Metropolitan or by an Episcopa.
They are:

Metropolitans and bishops

Present episcopal synod

The present members of the Episcopal Synod of Mar Thoma Church are:
Theodosius Mar Thoma 
Euyakim Coorilos 
Joseph Barnabas 
Thomas Timotheos 
Isaac Philoxenos 
Abraham Paulos 
Mathews Makarios 
Gregorios Stephanos 
Thomas Theethos

Mar Thoma Metropolitans 
The excommunication of Reformist bishops and their followers by the Syriac Orthodox Patriarch in 1875, the Synod of 1876 (Mulanthuruthy) and the Royal Court Verdict of 1889 were turning points in the history of the Malankara Syrian Church of Malabar. The Reformist (Metran) faction continued to consecrate bishops to the Malankara See without the consent of Patriarch as they claimed Malankara church is independent of the Syrian Church. Before the death of Malankara Metropolitan Mathews Athanasius, he consecrated Thomas Athanasius as Suffragan bishop of Malankara Church. Following the death of Mathews Athanasius, the suffragan succeeded as the Metropolitan of the Malankara See in 1877 which led to a schism in the Malankara church. Those who supported reformation loyally followed the Malankara Metropolitan who was legally evicted from the Malankara Syrian Church. He died in 1893 without consecrating a successor and suggesting a new name for the church. The Metropolitan of Malabar Independent Syrian Church stepped in and consecrated Titus Mar Thoma as the new bishop.

For the consecrations, from 1917 onward bishops from other churches were invited as guests. But the consecration was done only by the Metropolitan and was assisted as a witness by the other Bishops of the Mar Thoma Church and of the Malabar Independent Syrian Church.

Clergy
Semmasan (deacons):
The Sabha Prathinidhi Mandalam elects a Vaidika Selection board to select candidates for the ordained ministry of the church through recommendations (letters from bishops-clergy by the level of exposure in church or by personal sponsorships of bishops or written support pledged from bishops), exams (English, General knowledge and Bible) and pre- and post- theological training interviews (with theological-sociological aspects and scrutiny through psychological and health evaluations).

Following a Malankara Church tradition and from diasporic influence, the church follows a compulsory twelve-month (or 24 months with relocation, if failed in the first attempt) unpaid missionary service to those who are inclined to be a priest, before selection process as a "Tithe of Youth" program for "evaluation purposes". Additionally, this program was challenged in youth meets of the church at the time of its conception on the basis of non-guarantee in an entry, fast-changing world, career stagnation, and other economic factors and have arrived at a discussion level resolution of implementing this process after the pursual of their theological training and integrating the "Deacon" status during the time period under mentorship which enables the church to fill up NGO's, projects and mission fields with trained and theologically equipped individuals for staff duties and pastoring, thus avoid stress and negligence that would be otherwise imparted on the youth. During the intensive field training, when the inclined candidate is counted to be worthy for the controlled influx in church duties, the trained and experienced Deacons can be nominated for ordinations as Kassessas, by each diocese as the allotment.

Kassessa (clergy priests):
Persons receiving ordination as ministers shall be duly ordained deacons. They all have had their Bachelor of Divinity degree from the Mar Thoma Theological Seminary, Kottayam, Kerala, or from other recognized theological seminaries of India. The wife of a Kassissa is known as "Baskiamma" derived from" Baskiyomo in Syriac.

Vicars general:
From among the clergy who have completed 25 years of service in the ordained ministry and not less than sixty years of age are selected according to their contributions and ordained as vicars general. In the absence of the diocesan bishop, they may be appointed as deputy head of the bishopric.

History

Thomas Christians are popularly and traditionally called as Syrian Christians, in view of the Syriac liturgy (a variant of the classical form of Aramaic) used in church services since the early days of Christianity in India.

The Saint Thomas Christians remained as Church of Malabar with fraternity relationship with Church of East, Church of Antioch, Church of Alexandria, etc. till the Advent of Portuguese and Jesuits of Roman Catholic church in the 15th century. Thereafter, the Christians of St Thomas had been influenced by many belief streams at different points of time. These influences have later resulted in serious rifts and in the breaking down of the monolithic apostolic church to different fragments under different faith streams. They were organised as a Church in the 8th century, served by foreign bishops, and with a hereditary local chief called  Archdeacon (Arkadiyokon). In the 16th century the overtures of the Portuguese padroado to bring the Saint Thomas Christians into the Latin Rite Catholicism led to the first of several rifts in the community and the establishment of Pazhayakoor (Catholic) and Puthenkoor  factions. Since that time further splits have occurred, and the Saint Thomas Christians are now divided into several denominations, each with their own liturgies and traditions.

First century BC

On the southwestern side of the Indian peninsula; between the mountains and the Erythraean Sea (now the Arabian Sea); stretching from Kannur to Kanyakumari was the land called Cherarajyam, which was ruled by local chieftains. Later this land came to be known as the Malabar region and (now Kerala). Muziris (near Kochi) was the important entry port. After the discovery of Hippalus, every year 100 ships arrived here from various parts of the then known world, including Red Sea ports.

According to the Bible, during the time of Moses and Solomon, the Malabar Coast traded spices and luxury articles with Israel (I Kings 9:26–28, 10:11, 22; 2 Chronicles 8:18, 9:21).

Excavations carried out at Pattanam (near Kochi) from 2005 provided evidence that the maritime trade between Kerala and the Mediterranean ports existed even before 500 BC or earlier. It is possible that some of those traders who arrived from the west, including Jews, remained in Kerala.

While Augustus (31 BC- 14 AD) was the Roman emperor and Herod the Great (37–4 BC) was King of Judea, ambassadors from Malabar visited the Emperor according to an account of Nicolaus of Damascus. Certain nasrani writings hypothesize that these ambassadors were the Biblical Magi of Matthew 2:1, as a tradition.

First 15 centuries

Arrival of Saint Thomas
Saint Thomas Christians believe that Thomas the Apostle arrived in the Malabar Coast around AD 52. He landed at Muziris (now estimated as Pattanam, near Kochi on the Malabar Coast), after his first mission in the Parthian empire, during the era of King Gondophares It is believed that St. Thomas itinerated for 30 years in Kerala and proceeded to the East coast of India from Malankara and died a martyrs' death at a place called Mylapore-Chinnamalai in Tamil Nadu.

The Nazarenes in Malabar were either proselytized from mainstream Judaism by 'Mar Thomas' or 'Mar Bartholomeu'.

First Christians
In early Christian times, 'Nazranis' was not a separate religion, but a sect in the Jewish community. The term was used to denote followers of Jesus of Nazareth. (Acts. 24:5; 28:22). 'Khristianos' (or Christians) was initially used largely to refer non-Jewish people who followed Christ (Acts 11:26). In Kerala, the sect was known as 'Nazraani Margam'. Margam in Malayalam means, 'The Way'. (Acts 9:2; 19:9, 23; 22:4; 24:22). Thus, the word Nazraani clearly shows that many who joined them were Jews. But in Kerala, this name was replaced by the word 'Christians' in the 20th century.

The earliest families within the Jewish community to accept the path of Christianity through St. Thomas, later intermarried with the ethnic local community and Brahmins of the 6th century. This led to the upbringing of marginal class or 'sambandham' brahminic family clans like Pakalomattom, Sankarapuri and Kalli to a different socioeconomic status, they are now widely accepted as the first families who adopted an emigre way of life or 'Christianity' in Kerala. According to recent DNA research by Dr. Mini Kariappa, a significant number of Knanaya's share their ancestral roots with the West Eurasian gene pool of Jews.

Administration
Saint Thomas Christians were administratively under the single native dynastic leadership of Arkadyaqon (East Syrian term for an ecclesiastical head with extensive administrative powers, deriving from Greek αρχιδιάκονος = archdeacon) commonly referred as "Jathikku Karthavyan" ( Malayalam term meaning "Leader of The Community"). The Malankara Church believes that St. Thomas appointed elders at every place he preached to lead the believers. He prayed and laid his hands upon them, in the same way as the other disciples did (Book of Acts 6:1–6; 8:14–17; 13: 1–3). This was the system used until the arrival of Portuguese. By 1500, Malankara Church had Parish elders and a Church leader. Before the arrival of Portuguese, Latin was unknown to Malankara people. In the ‘'Decrees of The Synod of Udayamperoor'’ presented to the St. Thomas Christians in their mother tongue Malayalam, Malankara Mooppen was the name used to refer the Church leader, except on three occasions. During the period of Colonialism, (i.e., from the 16th century), the Portuguese Jesuits began deliberate attempts to annex the community into the Latin Rite of the Catholic Church, and in 1599 AD, they succeeded in their attempt through the infamous Synod of Diamper. Resentment against these forceful measures led the majority of the community under their Arkadyaqon Thomas to swear an oath never to submit to the Portuguese, known as the Coonan Cross Oath in 1653. For the first time in 1653, the Church leader was given the title Mar Thoma when Thomas Arkadyaqon was consecrated as Mar Thoma I. The present head of the Mar Thoma Church is the twenty-first Mar Thoma.

Pantaenus from Alexandria
In the 2nd century (189-190 AD) AD, Pantaenus, the Philosopher and Missionary sent by Bishop Demetrius of Alexandria to India, found that there were many Christians in India with a Persian Bishop and that they had a copy of the Gospel according to Matthew in Aramaic. These Christians were the early evangelists of Malankara Church.

Arrival of Knanaya Nazranis
During the time of King Shapur II (310–379) of Persia, a group of 400 immigrants (72 families) from Persia arrived in Malabar under the leadership of merchant Knai Thomman. They were engaged in trade and settled down in Kodungallur. Another immigration from Persia occurred around 825 under the leadership of Persian merchant Marwan Sabriso, with two Bishops, Sapro and Prodh. Together they were known as Knanaya/Kanai people. They continued to remain partially in an endogamous group within the Nasrani community. They cooperated with the Malankara Church, attended worship services together but remained a separate identity. By the 10th century, in Malabar there were two Nazrani groups, the Saint Thomas Christians and Knanaya community.

Bishops from Persia
Following the arrival of Christians from Persia, their bishops, priests or laymen began visiting them. Most of them were not able to return due to financial difficulties and travelling long distances. The Knanaya people were worshipping together with the St. Thomas Christians. So these visitors also attended these services. It was a matter of ongoing dispute between different churches in Kerala whether the Syrian bishops had any administrative responsibility or jurisdiction over the St. Thomas Nazrani Christians.

Persian crosses

Persian crosses were in churches once attended by Nasranis. Out of five Persian crosses, two are in Kottayam Knanaya Valia Palli. According to the archaeologists, the earliest one was made in the 7th century. The cross became a symbol of Christianity in the west, during the time of Constantine (272–337). Saint Thomas Christians of Malabar had hardly any contact with other Christians before the arrival of Knanaya people from Persia. Moreover, two of the oldest church buildings that still exist in South India do not have any marking of a Cross on their original structure. So most probably it was during the 7th century that the cross became a symbol of St. Thomas Christians.

Visits corroborating the existence of the Malankara Church

The existence of this Church in the early centuries is evident in the writings of ancient travelers.

 325 AD – It is recorded that there was a Syro-Chaldean bishop John "from India and Persia" who assisted at the Council of Nicea in 325 AD.
 522 AD – an Egyptian Monk, Cosmas Indicopleustes in his writings, ‘'Universal Christian Topography'’ mentions that there was this Church with a bishop from Persia.
 883 AD – Alfred the Great (849–899), King of Wessex, England reportedly sent gifts "in India to St. Thomas and to St. Bartholomew", through Sighelm, bishop of Sherborne.
 1225 AD – Chau Ju-Kua a Chinese traveller visited Kerala.
 1282 AD – Kublai Khan (1215–1294) Emperor of China sent an emissary to Kollam, It was followed by an emissary from Kollam under the leadership of a St. Thomas Christian.
 1292 AD – Marco Polo (1254–1324) on his return journey from China visited Kerala, mentions that "The people are idolaters, though there are some Christians and Jews among them".

Collection of deeds
The rulers of Kerala, in appreciation of their assistance, had given to the Malankara Nazranis, three deeds on copper plates. These are known as Cheppeds, Royal Grants, Sasanam etc. Five sheets of them are now in the custody of the Malankara Mar Thoma Syrian Church Headquarters at Thiruvalla.

Iravi Corttan Deed: In the year 774 AD. Sri Vira Raghava Chakravarti, gave a deed to Iravi Corttan of Mahadevarpattanam.
Tharissa palli Deed I: Perumal Sthanu Ravi Gupta (844–885) gave a deed in 849 AD, to Isodatta Virai for Tharissa Palli (church) at Curakkeni Kollam. According to historians, this is the first deed in Kerala that gives the exact date.
Tharissa palli Deed II: A continuation of the above deed was given sometime after 849 AD.

Portuguese period
The Portuguese started settling in India with the arrival of Vasco da Gama in 1498. For the next 200 years, they took control over the sea routes and were powerful in the western parts of India. By 1500, Malankara Church was spread from Kannur in the North to Kollam in the South. It included the Saint Thomas Christians and the endogamous group, Knanaya Christians. The Saint Thomas Christians went through changes with the encounter of Portuguese in 1599. In the 16th century the overtures of the Portuguese padroado to initiate the Saint Thomas Christians into the Catholic Church led to the first of several rifts in the community and the establishment of  Pazhayakoor and Puthenkoor factions. Since that time further splits have occurred.

Synod of Diamper
The Malankara Church had hardly any contact with the Western Church. The Portuguese used their power to bring the Malankara Church under Latin jurisdiction. A powerful Archbishop Aleixo de Menezes arrived in Goa in 1595. He then convened a Synod at Udayamperoor, south of Ernakulam, from 20 to 26 June 1599, known as the Synod of Diamper. Here the Archbishop demanded complete submission to the Latin jurisdiction. The representatives sent from various parishes in and around Cochin were forced to accept the decrees read out by the Archbishop.

Divisions among Saint Thomas Christians

A protest took place in 1653 with the Coonan Cross Oath. Under the leadership of Archdeacon Thomas (Mar Thoma I), the Thomas Christians publicly took an oath that they wouldn't obey the Jesuit bishops.

Rome sent Carmelites in two groups from the Propagation of the Faith to Malabar headed by Fr. Sebastiani and Fr. Hyacinth. Fr. Sebastiani arrived first in 1655. He began to deal directly with the Archdeacon Thomas (Mar Thoma I). Fr. Sebastiani gained the support of many, especially with the support of Palliveettil Chandy, Alexandar Kadavil and the Vicar of Muttam. These were the three councilors of Mar Thoma I, who was reconciled with Gracia (SJ)  before the arrival of Sebastaini, according to Jesuit reports.

The Pazhayakūr Catholic faction persistently challenged the validity of the ordination of Mar Thoma I by laying hands of 12 priests. It led many people to believe what they said and chose to rejoin with the catholic faction.

Between 1661 and 1662, out of the 116 churches, the Carmelites reclaimed eighty-four churches, leaving Archdeacon Mar Thomas I with thirty-two churches. The eighty-four churches and their congregations were the body from which the Syro Malabar Church and the Chaldean Syrian Church have descended. The other thirty-two churches and their congregations represented the nucleus from which the Syriac Orthodox (Jacobites & Orthodox), Thozhiyur, Mar Thoma (Reformed Syrians), Syro Malankara Catholics have originated.

In 1665 with the request of the Archdeacon, Gregorios Abdul Jaleel a Bishop sent by the Syriac Orthodox Patriarch of Antioch, arrived in India. A faithful group under the leadership of the Archdeacon welcomed him. The arrival of the Bishop Gregory of the Syriac Orthodox Church in 1665 marked the beginning of a formal schism among the St. Thomas Christians. Those who accepted the West Syrian theological and liturgical tradition of the Syriac Orthodox Church of Antioch of Gregory became known as the Jacobite, while the Syrian Catholics remained in communion with Rome and later came to be known as the Syro Malabar Church.

Oath of the Bent Cross

Under the leadership of their elder Thomas, Nazranis around Cochin gathered at Mattancherry church on Friday, 24 January 1653 (M.E. 828 Makaram 3) and made an oath that is known as the Great Oath of Bent Cross. 

Thomas Whitehouse, an Anglican Protestant missionary quotes from the "Church Missionary Society Report for 1818-19, p. 317.
"These Portuguese having murdered Mar Ignatius, we will no longer join them. We renounce them, and do not want either their love or their favour. The present Francis, bishop, shall not be our governor. We are not his children or followers. We will not again acknowledge Portuguese bishops."

Those who were not able to touch the cross-tied ropes on the cross held the rope in their hands and made the oath. Because of the weight it is believed by the followers that the cross bent a little and so it is known as "Oath of the bent cross" (Coonen Kurisu Sathyam).

Four months after this event, according to the beliefs, 12 elders of the church ordained the elder Thomas as their prelate with the ecclesiastical title Mar Thoma I.

Their beliefs and practices before the arrival of the Portuguese as evident in the canons of the Synod of Diamper.

Malankara Church,
maintained the spiritual presence of the body and blood of Christ in the sacrament.
had no knowledge of the term purgatory, but prayed for the dead.
had irregular practice of auricular confession.
only had a few celibacy clergy in monastic rank, while celibate bishops visited periodically from the Middle East.

Dutch period
The Dutch East India Company defeated Portuguese for the supremacy of spice trade in Malabar in the year CE 1663. Malankara Nazranis used this opportunity to escape from Latin persecution with the help of the Dutch East India Company. The Dutch brought Bishop Gregorios Abdul Jaleel of Jerusalem of the Syrian Orthodox Church in their trading vessel in CE 1665. Thomas Arkadyaqon who was consecrated as Mar Thoma I entered into a relationship with the West Syriac Orthodox Church and gradually adopted West Syriac liturgy and practices. The Dutch were on the Malabar Coast from 11 November 1604 - 1795. Mar Thoma I to Mar Thoma VI were the prelates during this period.

British period
The English defeated the Dutch in 1795 and took over Cochin during the time of Mar Thoma VI. In 1806, Rev. Dr. Claudius Buchanan, an Anglican missionary visited Malankara and met Mar Thoma VI. The Bible that was translated from the original Aramaic into Malayalam by two Malpans (Syriac Professors) was printed with the help of Buchanan.

The early British Residents happened to be people of evangelical persuasions and were curious about the native church. In 1808, a bond for the sum of 3000 Star Pagoda (Rs. 10,500) was handed over by General Colin Macaulay, the British Resident in Travancore to the Govt. for Mar Thoma VII with the condition that the interest (known as Vattipanam) be paid to the Metropolitan of the Syrian Church of Malabar.
The next Resident Colonel John Munro was approached by a monk (Ramban) Pulikkottil Joseph Ittoop, with the idea of setting up a seminary for the Malankara church. The idea appealed to Munro and under his patronage, the Ramban got the construction completed by 1815. At the resident's behest, the Anglican Church Mission Society sent its missionaries on a Mission of Help, to educate the seminarians. In 1815, Joseph Ramban was consecrated by Philexenos of the Thozhyoor Church and was given the ecclesiastical title Dionysius II. To make the Malankara Church accept him as their head, Col. Munro had to get the rulers of Travancore and Cochin issue Royal proclamations ordering Christians to render obedience to Dionysius II. The next two prelates were also selected by Col. Munro and Royal proclamations were issued to them also.

The British missionaries believed that a reformation of the Malankara Church was imperative (since, for instance, they found in the Indian church "those doctrines which we threw off at the Reformation: "Purgatory ... worshipping and adoration of images and relics, and also invocation of saints'") whose presence made reform imperative, and ventured to bring it about through a process of theological instruction and subtle persuasion. By and by, they prodded Metropolitan Punnathra Dionysius III into convening an assembly of his leading kathanars and missionaries at Mavelikkara to discuss the matter. This meeting which took place on 3 December 1818, appointed a committee of six elder kathanars to come up with scheme for reformation, in consultation with the metropolitan and missionaries. Some priests like Abraham Malpan, Kaithayil Gheevarghese Malpan etc., who worked along with the missionaries at the Kottayam seminary were part of this committee. They were especially receptive to Anglican ideas. Before the committee brought their findings Punnathra Dionosyus died and Cheppad Dionosyus became the Malankara Metropolitan.  Cheppad Dionosyus rejected the committee findings and went on with actions that was against the reforms made by his predecessors. Later, as Anglicans such as Joseph Peet tried to dominate the Pazhaya Seminary and started to create other issue in the Church, Malankara metropolitan Dionysius IV convened a synod at Mavelikkara on 16 January 1836, where-in the participants resolved not to deviate from their Oriental Orthodox faith or traditions and to remain faithful to the Patriarch of Antioch. This ended the official partnership between the missionaries and the Malankara Syrian Church.

Reformation in Malankara Church
The British Anglicans had many well-wishers in the Malankara Church. Priests like Abraham Malpan and others continued to collaborate with the missionaries to reform the church from within. In 1836, Abraham Malpan, Kaithayil Gheevarghese malpan and other reformist kathanars submitted a memorandum to Resident Col. Fraser, levelling charges of abuse against metropolitan Dionysius IV and a 23-point stratagem for the reformation of the church. But as the metropolitan was against all reforms, nothing came of it. Regardless, Abraham Malpan produced a reformed revision of the West Syriac Rite and used it in the seminary and his parishes. Consequently, Abraham Malpan was excommunicated. Malankara metropolitan Dionysius IV refused to ordain anyone trained by reformist malpans.

Abraham Malpan
Though Maramon Palakunnathu Abraham Malpan was bounteous in his temperament, he never hesitated to introduce reforms in both teaching and practice. He also insisted on a high moral standard of conduct for laity and clergy alike. All this created a ferment in the Malankara Church and its effects are still discernible in the Church as a whole.

Principal reforms

Changes carried out during reformation:

Icons, pictures, statues, and drawings of saints were removed from churches, and places of worship.
Considered the practice of praying for the dead and of doing obeisance at their graves with lighted candles as abhorrent.
Intercession of saints and prayers for the dead were discarded. All prayers, worship and devotion to the Blessed Virgin Mary and the saints were omitted. All prayer requests to dead and prayers to uplift the dead from sin and suffering were omitted.
Insisted that Sunday services are to be held in a reverent and spiritual way. During that time reading and expounding scriptures is to be done.
Conducted worship services, including Holy Communion in the mother tongue, Malayalam along with Syriac.
Liturgy amended to eliminate all Monophysite influences.
Holy Communion was not celebrated when there were none to receive.
Mandated that communion under both kinds should be distributed separately.
Auricular confession was discontinued.
Believed that those who come for confession should ask for forgiveness with fasting and prayer, instead of offering oil, incense and candles.
Insisted that bishops should ordain only candidates who have been examined by them and the malpans (Meaning:- Syriac scholars).
Repudiated the custom of smearing charcoal on the forehead on Ash Wednesday.

Doctrinal positions
The Church accepts the Bible and the Nicene creed as the basis for all matters of faith and doctrine.
The Church accepts the principle of justification by faith alone.
The Church accepts the principle of salvation by grace alone.
The Church adheres to the doctrine of sole mediation of Christ
The Church emphasizes the Priesthood of All Believers
Only the councils of Nicea, Constantinople and Ephesus are commemorated in the Eucharist.
The Church is neither Nestorian nor Monophysite, but a Reformed Oriental Church.
The Church does not subscribe to the concept of Eucharistic Sacrifice.
The Clergy is dedicated to avoiding benefices other than the regulated salary, as a part of the principle of simple life (a Christian ideal of being poor and humble with unclouded conscientious and to be guarded away from mortal greed) for self and the adult laity.
Child Baptism is upheld and given to children born in Christian families. Adult Baptism is given to new believers who come from other religions.
The Church accepts the Perpetual virginity, Divine motherhood and Assumption of Mary, but regards that it has nothing to do with saintly intercession or a mediatrix role.
With regard to the title of St. Mary as the Mother of God, the church affirms that the title was used by early Church fathers. The Church also recognises her as the Blessed Virgin Mary, Mother of Christ, who is God, not that the nature of the Word or his divinity received the beginning of its existence from the holy Virgin, but that, since the holy body, which the Word of God became, was born from her, the Word is said to be born according to the flesh (Gospel of St.John:1:14).
As to her titles 'Mother of the Church' and 'Mother of all true Christians', biblical interpretation is used (Revelation to St.John:12:17).
The Church calls St. Mary as Blessed and Holy as expressed in the liturgy.
The Church endorses in the remembrance and respect of Saints, Martyrs, and acknowledgment of their feast days, but prohibits veneration and intercession through them.
The lives of Saints and Martyrs are seen as an exemplar and inspiring to the Christian Model of living.
The Church does not declare anyone saint or sinner but people who have led exceptionally devout (saintly)lives are acknowledged; and saints declared by all Christian denominations are called Saints thereupon with respect.
Identifies Iconography (icons, images and drawings) as Christian or religious art. They are seen as spirituality in art but they are not supposed to be used for worship.
Remembrance of dead loved ones is seen as natural and human but prayers for the departed were cancelled out to signify that salvation does not occur after death. There is no belief in purgatory. 
The Mission of spreading the Gospel is observed as the duty of the Church. The Church must work with an evangelical zeal.
Expounding of the Holy Scriptures and their interpretations are seen as vital to religious services.
Syriac is acknowledged as the liturgical language of the Church and is used alongside the vernacular for all occasions. 
The Holy Communion (Holy Qurbana), being a Dominical Sacrament and thus divinely instituted by Christ must be observed utmost spiritually and reverently and not just as a mere ritual.
The Church gives freedom to the believers on the experience of the Holy Communion (on substantiation). It is understood as the grace of God to the individual. Nevertheless, the experience is viewed as a "Sacred Mystery".
Confession is General and is said through prayer before the Holy Communion. The Faithful are supposed to confess their sins privately to God (at home, Church, etc.) and to their brethren, if they have sinned against them (Epistle of St.James:5:16).

Course of events
The first printed Malayalam Bible, translated from Syriac was published in 1811. Known as Ramban Bible it contained only the four Gospels. By 1841, the whole Bible was translated, printed and released. Counselled by Anglican missionaries who taught at the Orthodox Theological Seminary, Mar Thoma XI convened a meeting of representatives of the Malankara Church with the missionaries at Mavelikkara in 1818. In that meeting, a review committee was appointed to recommend reforms, in consultation with the metropolitan and the missionaries. Abraham Malpan, Kaithayil Geevarghese Malpan, Eruthikkal Markose Kathanar, Adangapurathu Joseph Kathanar were members of this committee. This was the first step in carrying out Reformation in Malankara Church.

On 5 September 1836, the reformation was planned. The strategy was determined by a group of 12 clergymen under the leadership of Abraham Malpan. They issued an encyclical describing what they believed were the wrong teachings, a statement listing twenty-four practices of the Church which they believed were "evil" and had crept in by its association with other Churches and religions and the same as a petition to a British Resident.

On 27 August 1837 (Sunday), then suspended Abraham Malpan conducted the Holy Communion service in mother tongue Malayalam at his home parish at Maramon. Clergymen, who supported him also did the same thing in various other parishes on the same day.

Connected with a saint (Baselios Yeldo), every year in the first week of October, there was a church festival at Maramon. During that time a wooden statue of that saint, they called "Muthappen" (Meaning:- Elder father) was taken around in procession, and people used to venerate the saint by offering prayers and ask for intercession. In 1837, Abraham Malpan from deeper biblical understandings and of the spiritual scruples surrounding it, took the statue and threw it into a well saying, "Why consult the dead on behalf of the living?" (Isaiah 8:19). So when the festival came there was no statue to be taken out for the procession.

The use of the revised liturgy and the changes he brought about in practices disgruntled Mar Thoma XII. So Abraham Malpan was excommunicated. Deacons trained by him were refused priesthood. But Abraham Malpan was not disheartened. He continued with his spirited reforms. He returned to Maramon. Many of his students joined him to continue their studies. All those who believed that "The Church" needed a revitalization also joined him. Members of parishes in Kozhencherry, Kumbanad, Eraviperoor, Thumpamon, Elanthoor, Kundara, Kottarakara, Mavelikkara, Mallapally, and many other places made trips to Maramon to attend the service in Malayalam and listen to his sermons. Doors were also opened for reformation in other places by ministers who supported him.

At this stage, he had three choices in front of him. Repent and go to the beliefs under Antioch; join the Anglican Church with western aid; or go forward with the Cleansing and restoring "The Church" to what he thought would bring it to a pristine position, A church uncontaminated by avarice, venality, licentiousness, and rapacity. He selected the third one. Abraham Malpan died in 1845.

Realising the need for a bishop to lead the reformists, Abraham malpan sent his nephew Deacon Matthews to the patriarch in Antioch. The patriarch, unaware of Mathew's reformation leanings, ordained him as bishop Mathews Athanasius in 1842 and he returned to Travancore in 1843. Metropolitan Dionysius IV sent word to the patriarch that he has been deceived and called for prompt corrective action. Mathews Athanasius did not have the approval of the majority of Malankara Christians who were opposed to reforms. In spite of that, the initial patriarchate delegations failed in their mission to help their loyalists. More than anything else, this was due to the British support for the Reformist bishop and Mathews Athanasius ultimately became Malankara Metropolitan in 1852. Mathews Athanasius published the liturgy without the prayer to St. Mary. He consecrated Ouseph Koorilos, as Metropolitan/Bishop for Malabar Independent Church. The entirety of strong-arm actions incited many clergymen and Pulikkottil Ouseph Kathanar went to Antioch in 1864. He returned as Dionysious V in 1865.

The Orthodox conservatives led by Dionysious V repeatedly sought intervention from the See of Antioch. Discerning the source of the reformists' strength, Patriarch Ignatius Peter IV travelled to London. Whilst being there, he made many supplications to several high ecclesiastical and governmental authorities, pleading to end the partisan British support for Mathews Athanasius in India. Eventually, the British government and churchmen came to accept a position of neutrality with respect to the affairs of the Malankara Church. The Archbishop of Canterbury Archibald Campbell Tait apprised the patriarch of this change in British stance. Armed with significant success, the patriarch sailed for India.

Separation of the Reformists and establishment of Mar Thoma Church

After reaching India, the Antiochian patriarch did everything within his power to aid the traditionalist Orthodox faithful. In 1875, Patriarch Ignatius Peter IV excommunicated Mathews Athanasius, Thomas Athanasius (ordained by Mathews Athanasius as his successor) and their Reformist followers from the Malankara Syrian Church. The Reformists desperately besought the Archbishop of Canterbury as well as British authorities, to intervene on their behalf, but to no avail. The British colonial administration abstained from extending their crucial endorsement to any one faction, thereby disengaging themselves from local church matters. Thus, the rival parties had to settle their disputes, entirely by means of court litigations.

Dionysious V and his supporters filed a case on 4 March 1879. (Case O.S. No. 439 of 1054) demanding the possession of the seminary and the control of assets of the Church. Thomas Athanasius was then the Metropolitan.

During the course of this litigation (1879–1889), answering a question Thomas Athanasius Metropolitan said,

A meeting was convened by the Maharaja of Travancore, before the final verdict was given, Athanasius testified that,

The final verdict which came on 12 July 1889, upheld the conservative position on the Syriac Orthodox Patriarchate of Antioch, as being the only competent ecclesiastical authority historically authorized to ordain and appoint bishops to the Malankara Metropolitanate. The ruling declared Dionysious V the rightful Malankara Metropolitan owing to his loyalty to the Antiochian patriarchate known as Jacobite Syrian Christian Church wherefrom he received direct consecration and his acceptance by the majority of Malankara Christians. The judgement also dismissed all claims of the reformists and their leader Thomas Athanasius to the Metropolitanate or its assets. The Metran Kakshi decided to remain as an independent Malankara Church, and to give primary authority to the Holy Bible and continue as the successors of St. Thomas throne. They separated and established the Reformed Mar Thoma Syrian Church.

Mar Thoma church during Indian Independence Movement

Many in the Church were fascinated by Gandhian philosophy and particularly its Primates Abraham Thoma, Yuhanon Mar Thoma, and Alexander Mar Thoma were strong Advocates of Gandhian methods. They wore Ecclesiastical robes stitched from Khadi. The church actively worked in areas of education, empowerment of women, eradication of social evils, and self-reliance. Mar Thoma Sabha councils and Maramon Convention became a platform for disseminating Nationalist ideas. Many nationalist leaders like K. Keshavan, C. V. Kunjiraman, T. M. Varghese, Pattam Thanupillai had used Maramon Convention to mobilize people against Divan Sir C.P. Ramaswami Iyer's move to form an Independent Travancore separate from India. In 1936 Kunjiraman through his speech at Maramon gave an ultimatum to Travancore Royalty to give freedom of worship in temples for all Hindus immediately or see mass conversions to Christianity. The practice of political leaders attending with the Christian gathering at Maramon has its origin from that period.

Ramaswami Iyer liquidated the Quilon bank and sealed off Malayala Manorama, the leading newspaper, for criticizing the divan. Abraham Mar Thoma spoke about these notorious acts and visited those who were jailed by him. He further visited the Maharaja of Travancore and complaint about Divans tyrannical rule. Mar Thoma church at this point passed a church resolution against Divan and independent Travancore which infuriated the divan and ordered for the Metropolitans arrest and imprisonment. However, the arrest order was not executed. It was all done at a point of time when other churches and communities of Travancore praised divan or feared to utter a word against the divan. Later the Mar Thoma church had to pay the price for that social action. The land allotted in the heart of Thiruvananthapuram to construct a church by Maharaja Sree Moolam Thirunal was taken back. Mar Thoma church was selectively targeted by Divan, by not giving permissions for the construction of cemeteries and new church buildings.

Thevarthundiyil Titus popularly known as Titusji was the only Christian in the band of 78 inmates selected by Gandhiji from Sabarmati Ashram for breaking the salt law at Dandi in 1930 (Popularly known as Salt March). In 1937 when Mahatma Gandhiji was touring Kottayam, Mar Thoma Seminary School opened its doors to Gandhiji. He stayed a night there with K. K. Kuruvila is popularly known as Kerala Deenabandhu (because of his close association with C. F. Andrews Deenabandhu), then principal of the school, he was an MA graduate from Trinity College (Connecticut). Kuruvila was the founder of newspaper Kerala Bhooshanam which was active during the movement for responsible government in Travancore during the 1940s. K. C. Thomas (1901-1976) another noted freedom fighter of the era and once President of "Nivarthana Prasthanam" was in the thick of the agitations against Sir C.P.'s rule in Travancore. He was the secretary of the Jilla Committee of the State Congress was arrested along with Kannara Gopala Panikkar and jailed on 21 September 1938. Their Arrests led to widespread protests in Chengannur and finally led to the infamous 'Mills Maidhan Event' on 28 September 1938 where Divans police used brutal force to dismiss the protesting crowd which resulted in bloodshed. Cherian Thomas son of K.C. Thomas was actively involved with the Bhoodan Movement of Acharya Vinoba Bhave. N.G. Chacko, the freedom fighter plunged into freedom struggle during 1920. He was arrested and jailed for anti-British protests and waving black flag in protest against the visit of the Prince of Wales Lord Wellington, then Governor-General in 1921. P.T. Punnoose is another leader of the era, he started his political activities through Congress party in 1938 however later he became a Communist leader. He was the Secretary of Travancore Communist Party and one of the organisers of the Punnapra Vayalar Revolt. He laid strong foundations for the Communist party in Ambalappuzha, Cherthala, and Alappuzha. He was later elected from Ambalapuzha Constituency to the Indian Parliament.

T. M. Varghese was a Christian among the trio who formed the Joint Political Party and spearheaded for the formation of a responsible Government. Another Mar Thoma Syrian and Gandhian of that era K.A. Mathew started his activities by writing articles in the magazine "The Christian Patriot"  which articulated the dissemination of nationalist feelings among Indian Christians. In 1939 at Amsterdam when the union jack was raised in  "International Christian Youth Assembly" for Indian delegates, K.A. Mathew raised the Indian flag in solidarity and carried along with him. Back in Travancore he was active in the movement against Divan Sir C.P. and his independent Travancore. He opposed a move among the Syrian Christians of Tiruvalla to erect a statue of Divan at the center of the town. He was implicated in many false allegations and cases by the divan and jailed him many times. He was elected to legislative assembly in 1948. Barrister George Joseph a follower of Mahatma Gandhi and a Home Rule proponent mobilized the people in the Vaikom Satyagraha in early stages but later handed over the leadership to K. Kelappan as per the wishes of Gandhiji. During his stay in Madurai he was closely associated with labour union movement and worked in changing the Criminal Tribes Act (CTA), which targeted specifically Kallar and Mukkulathor community. They affectionately called him Rosappu Durai (Master with a rose flower). He was a close friend of K. Kamaraj and Tamil Poet Subramanya Bharathi. Subramanya Bharathi Penned the patriotic song "Viduthalai Viduthalai" when he was staying at George's home. Seven years prior to his death George Joseph joined the Catholic church. Many young Syrian Christians who were staying in Malaya during the 1940s was attracted to Netaji Subhas Chandra Bose and joined the INA.  O.C. Chacko a Marthomite from Kuriannoor, joined the Indian National Army in 1943 when he was in Singapore. A Mar Thoma priest, Rev. C.V. George from Ranny in his youth as an advocate was an active member in the freedom struggle and was jailed for his involvement in activities against British Raj. He is the only Mar Thoma Priest who is recognized and awarded as a freedom fighter by the Government.

After India attained its freedom in 1947, the Government of India lowered to the level of a despotic rule during the time of Emergency of 1975. The Emergency was followed after election malpractice allegation and following the verdict against Indira Gandhi. All leaders who spoke against the Emergency rule were jailed or kept in house arrest. It was at this time Yuhanon Mar Thoma wrote a letter to Indira Gandhi, the then Prime Minister of India criticizing emergency and requesting to follow ideals of constitution. There were strong rumors about the anticipatory arrest of Yuhanon Mar Thoma. M.M.Thomas another Mar Thoma Syrian and theologian advocating Ecumenism of Churches had written many articles on the emergency situation. In spite of criticism from many Christian groups, M.M. Thomas made his point in depicting the basic fact of violation of human rights and stressed the need of the democratic organization of the people for the realization of social justice in India. Mar Thoma Church also passed a resolution against Emergency and for the restoration of democracy privately. Mar Thoma church was also closely associated with the land for the landless and home for the homeless movement much before Acharya Vinoba Bhave initiated Bhoodan movement.

Faith and practices of the church

Liturgy

The word "liturgy" is derived from the Greek word leitourgia (leitos/loas: people +ergos: work) which means a service rendered to God and people. When the Bible was not available, the liturgy took the role of the Bible, much of the scripture is formed in the liturgical context. The original liturgical language used by the Malankara Church was Aramaic and Hebrew. The Bible that was in use also was in Hebrew. Later when Syriac replaced Aramaic in eastern countries, and the arrival of Knanaya people from Persia in AD 345, the Malankara Church began using Syriac. The Bible used in the Malankara Church is called the "Peshitta" and was in Estrangelo Syriac. This was the Bible that was in use till Malayalam (the language of Kerala) translation was available. The first printed Malayalam Bible, translated from Syriac was published in 1811 by Philipose Ramban with the provision of Claudius Buchanan, known as Ramban Bible it contained the four Gospels. (A copy of this Bible was later presented to Buchanan and is kept at Cambridge University Library.) By 1841, the whole Bible was translated, printed and released by missionary-scholar Benjamin Bailey with the help of Chandu Menon, a tahsildar in the Madras State service. Even though bishops from Syrian churches visited Kerala, they did not attempt to change the Bible into the newer forms of Syriac or to the native language. In June 1876, Patriarch of Antioch Ignatius Pathrose IV visited Kerala and a majority of the Malankara Church accepted him as the head of their church. But those who did not join them continued to follow their own leaders and kept their peculiar identity garnered from reformation. After Mar Thoma Church had begun to use the liturgy in mother tongue Malayalam, other churches continued to follow the same for a deeper engagement with the laity. A revised version of the ancient and apostolic liturgy known as People's liturgy, the Liturgy of St James (Gal.1:18-19), was adopted in the church, later the liturgy has been translated into various languages including English, Hindi, Tamil, Telugu, and Kannada. The Mar Thoma church follows the West Syrian liturgical tradition and is Eastern in the nature of its worship and ethos.

There are six liturgies other than Saint James liturgy (Mar Yakub liturgy) used in the church and a priest can exercise freedom in using them but should satisfy the requirement of "joint congregation act/involvement" and permission from the respective diocese head. The six other liturgies are:

Canonical hours
The Marthomites pray the canonical hours as contained in the Shehimo at seven fixed prayer times while facing the eastward direction.

Sacraments of the church
The seven sacraments (Koodashas) of Mar Thoma Church are:

Places of worship

Those who were converted by St. Thomas in the 1st century continued worshiping in synagogues. Then they moved to their homes and by the 2nd century, they began to build their own churches (called ‘'Palli'’) in various places. It is believed that there were such small gatherings at Maliankara, Piravom, Niranam (Nelcynda) and Nilakkal. St. Thomas Christians in Kerala, still construct their churches combining the design of Solomon's temple at Jerusalem, and Indian Vastu Shastra. So from outside it looks like a Hindu temple but inside it is like a Jewish temple. It is divided into Sanctuary (Madbaha) and Nave (Haickala). Mar Thoma Churches are built east–west with the Sanctuary (Madbaha) to the east.  East is the place of the rising suns that is the symbol of the Risen Christ and His Second coming. East also symbolizes the Garden of Eden that was situated in the east. The Sanctuary is separated from the rest of the place by a veil with the sign of a cross. The worship of the Eastern churches symbolizes heavenly worship. Madbaha symbolically represents Heaven and Haickala, the earth, and veil the sky. The Madbaha is demarcated from the bema with an open arch and a veil. At the beginning of Holy Qurbana Service, the veil is drawn from the right side to left. Mar Thoma Syrians have abandoned the West syriac tradition of erecting more than one Altar and Madhbaha in Church and also forbade dedication of Altar/Thronos in name of a Saint or a Holy church father and conducting Holy Qurbana at Altar simultaneously or separate. The pulpit and lectern are also usually found at the extension of the bema. Bema is demarcated from the nave and transept (widely uses a vestibule space before the nave) with altar rails. The Choir is seated at one end of the transepts in the same level of the nave. Now there is a tendency to follow western architectural designs and introducing ciboriums, semi-domes, etc.

Cross used in Mar Thoma Church Chancel particularly at the center of the Altar is the Easter Cross. In Mar Thoma worship practice the visual Sign of the Cross is used many times. When the Priest gives the blessing he performs the sign of the cross; the worshipers, as a sign of accepting the blessing also reciprocates blessing oneself. The same is done at the time of the declaration of the Trinity and also at the time of indication of the Cross. Generally iconostases, pictures or statues of saints are not kept in Mar Thoma churches. Until the middle of the 20th century, all worshipers were seated on a mat spread on the floor. Children occupy the first rows and behind them on right side females and towards left males are seated. A narrow space between left and right is demarcated with a red carpet starting from the main door signifying that the church is sharing the worship space of heaven and joining the communion. Now many churches provide chairs or benches. During the Passion week services, chairs are removed, to facilitate worshiping according to their ancient custom, which includes prostrating a number of times. Everyone including clergy and the laity, who take part in the worship, faces east for the service.

Fasts and Festivals of Mar Thoma Church
Mar Thoma Church's evolution from a reformation base only strengthened it to follow best practices of its Syriac traditions. Lents (Nombu) and other church festivals are church's structural and liturgical base. Feasts and fasts are an integral part of the traditions of a Christian community. However, the way believers follow these fasts and feasts differ from church to church. Mar Thoma church being a part of Antiochian tradition churches, follows all the canonical feasts and fasts which are related to important events in the life of Jesus Christ. The constitution of the church states that the feasts, fasts or lents are not to be removed or altered from the church at any time. It Includes Observance of the Sunday as the day of the lord and other fast and feast days in the church calendar. Each Sunday is dedicated to meditating on subjects prescribed in church lectionary.

Fasts of the Church
The church mainly observes the fifty days before the period of Easter and twenty-five days before Christmas as fast days. Mar Thoma church doesn't have a canonical instruction on how a believer should follow the Lents. However, as a matter of practice believers follow certain dietary restrictions with the right spiritual diet as followed over generations. A person committed to lent, is in a spiritual training with introspection and renewal of their commitment to be an imitation of set principles by Jesus Christ. With the will for fellowship, each person anchors bio-psycho-spiritually with Jesus Christ through prayer. Lent is often considered as a refreshful practice for thoughts and soul for cultivating seven gifts of the Holy Spirit (Book of Isaiah ). An amount of money that is saved by giving up certain types of luxuries during the lent period is typically deposited in the offertory on Good Friday for Church's social services for the afflicted and hungry (Book of Isaiah ). Post-modernistic view about lent is as an empowering practice that transforms a person for making social and interpersonal impact. Every weekday in Great Lent there are specific liturgical services which include prostration or profound bows a number of times. The lents of the church are:

 Great Fast: consists of 40 days from the second week of February (Petrutha:Reconciliation) ending with 40th Friday, this symbolizes the forty days fast of Jesus Christ in the desert and extends with a ten days fast, that signifies the betrayal, passion, and crucifixion of Jesus Christ (Passion week-Hasha) as per oriental tradition. It spreads to 7 weeks with a total of 50 days (Ambathu Nombu). Ash Wednesday is the first Wednesday of the lent, it is not observed with significance. 
 Nativity Fast (Yeldo lent): 25 days prior to Christmas which includes annunciation to Zechariah and to Joseph.
 Dormition of Mary (Shunoyo Lent): 15 days, in August. (This is not observed widely but some may fulfill this fast along with the reformation day celebration without the doctrinal underpinnings.)
 Fast of Nineveh (Lent of Yonah): 3 days in January.
 Apostles' Fast (Lent of Sleeha's): 13 specific days from the second week of June.

Feasts of the Church
The main feast or festival days of the church are Feast of Nativity, Baptism of Jesus, Feast of Annunciation, Palm Sunday, Easter, Feast of the Ascension, Day of Pentecost, and Feast of the Transfiguration. The most important festivals of the church are that of in Holy Week (Hasha) and Christmas. The festivals of Mar Thoma Church can be divided into 4 categories, they are:

 Maranaya Festivals- Festivals that are based on events in the life of Jesus Chris: Mainly they are Danaha (Baptism of Christ/Epiphany), Mayaltho (Presentation of Jesus at the Temple), Suboro (Feast of the Annunciation), Hosanna (Palm Sunday), Easter (Resurrection Sunday or Kyomtho), Christmas (Feast of Nativity or Yaldo).
 Roohanaya Festivals- Festivals related to Holy Spirit. Mainly they are Suloko (Feast of the Ascension), Sunday of Pentecost or Trinity Sunday- It is fifty days after Easter Day (at times it is observed separately), it commemorates the descent of the holy spirit on to the Church, Day of Transfiguration- 10th week after the day of Pentecost, this is when traditionally low abv vinification is started at homes for Christmas.
 Ethanaya Festivals- Festivals related to the church like Kudos Etho: The sanctification of the church and beginning of liturgical year, Hudos Etho - The dedication or renewal of the church, Reformation Day (August), Mar Thoma Church Day (In relation to Thomas the Apostle on 21 December).
 Dukrano Festivals: Church day separated for meditation on Martyrdom of Apostles without intercession (This is not observed widely except St. Stephen's Day).

The Ethanaya Feasts Kudos Etho and Hudos Etho is in the second and third Sundays of November, it is also considered as the beginning of a liturgical year. The Holy week or passion week (Hasha) is the week before Easter and the last week of Great Lent, this includes Palm Sunday (Hosanna- Commemorating princely entry of Christ into Jerusalem), Maundy Thursday (Pesach- Commemorating last meal or passover of Jesus Christ with his disciples and the Holy Communion was instituted on this day), Good Friday (Holy Friday - Commemorating crucifixion of Christ at Golgotha), Joyous Saturday, and Easter (Resurrection Sunday - Commemorating Resurrection of Christ).

Christmas is celebrated by all members of the Church, to commemorate the birth of Jesus Christ. During this time, parishes will be involved in Christmas carols and the celebration of Christmas Day church services with Christmas cakes. Before the 1850s, Mar Thoma church celebrated Christmas on 6 January, the day of Epiphany. By the end of last century, Christmas trees, Christmas Stars-an illuminative paper decoration made in the form of star or sunburst, Christmas lights, Sky lanterns, Nativity crib, Santa Claus' and other related festive traditions have appeared in the church.

Ordination of Women and Transgender people
There are no theological impediments to the ordination of women, in the Mar Thoma Syrian Church. Being theologically Reformed, this church endorses the Priesthood of all believers. However the church hasn't ordained women yet, as it is not in accordance with Eastern Christian traditions. Female Archbishop Kay Goldsworthy of the Anglican Church of Australia, was one of the main speakers at the 2020 Maramon Convention, organized by the Mar Thoma Church. On the question of women's ordination, the Mar Thoma church's official response to the Baptism, Eucharist and Ministry document of the World Council of Churches reads,

Howsoever it is to be noted that the Mar Thoma Church has provided caution that the BEM Document should not be considered as a confession of faith and order, rather it should be seen as a document that closes that gap between Churches across the world.

The Mar Thoma Church is involved with several movements and projects, aiming at the upliftment and empowerment of the Transgender community. In 2018, two transgender speakers were given the stage, to address the Maramon convention of the Mar Thoma Church.
Joseph Mar Thoma, a former head of the Mar Thoma Church, made it clear that there are no biblical grounds to deny priesthood and baptism for transgender individuals. It is also noteworthy that Joseph Mar Thoma, the former head of the Mar Thoma Church took the example of  "Philip and the Eunuch", and how the Eunuch played an important role in development of Ethiopian Christianity. 

Theodosius Mar Thoma the current head of the Mar Thoma Church, has said that the time will come, when transgender people would be ordained as priests in the church. He said,

Organizations

Auxiliary organizations
Development Department; Christian Agency for Rural Development (CARD); Mar Thoma Medical Mission; Mar Thoma Sabha Mandiram Fellowship; Social Welfare Institutions; Theological Institutions; Educational Institutions; Technical Institutions; Study Centres; Church Animation Centre; and Camp Centres are other empowerment organizations of the church.

Educational institutions
Nine colleges, six higher secondary schools, one vocational higher secondary school, eight high schools, one training school, five technical institutions plus other educational institutions owned and managed by individuals and by parishes.

Other institutions
There are 38 social welfare institutions, 14 destitute homes, and ten hospitals. The Mar Thoma Theological Seminary, Kottayam (established 1926) & Karukachal (Annex), Dharmajyoti Vidyapeedom, Haryana, E.J. Institute of Evangelism, and 4 other institutes cater to the theological education of both the clergy and the laity. Three study centres at Managanam, Kottayam and Trivandrum for arranging regular study programs and to provide opportunities for creative dialogue between Church and society on various ethical, moral, social and religious issues. The religious education of children is looked after by the Sunday School Samajam (organized in 1905) and the work among youth is carried on by the Youth Department, (the Yuvajana Sakhyam organized in 1933). The Church has a Women's Department (the Mar Thoma Suvisesha Sevika Sanghom organized in 1919).

Maramon Convention

The Mar Thoma Evangelistic Association, the missionary wing of the Mar Thoma Church, is in charge of organising the Maramon Convention, One of the largest annual Christian gathering in Asia. It takes place in Maramon, near Kozhencherry, during February on the vast sand-bed of the Pampa River next to the Kozhencherry Bridge. The first convention was held in March 1895 for 10 days.

The Maramon Convention is principally an assembly of Christians who go there once a year to listen to the gospel as read and expounded by Christian leaders from all over India as well as abroad. This provides a revived ideological and experiential faith in accordance to the need of the laity and period of time. It is in tune with Mathew 6:5. Attendees sit on the sand bed, Old and invalid people are given chairs with separate sponsored or paid seating arrangements. Generally, one session is for ecumenical messages by invited leaders of other churches.

Ecumenical relations

The church actively participates in the programs of the World Council of Churches, the Christian Conference of Asia, the National Council of Churches and the Kerala Christian Council. Mar Thoma Church was attending meetings of World Council of Churches from its first meeting in 1948 at Amsterdam. At the WCC meetings held in Evanston, Juhanon Mar Thoma Metropolitan was elected as one of its presidents. Since then the Church representatives attended all the General meetings.

Relationship with the Anglican Communion

Due to the historic links of the Malankara reformation to the Anglican missionary enterprise in colonial India and the resultant formative influence, the Mar Thoma Church maintain close relations with the Anglican Church. The Church's theology and doctrines are closest to that of Anglicans; hence Mar Thoma as well as some Anglican Churches commemorate each other's bishops, in their respective Eucharists. The Mar Thoma church is in full communion with all the churches of the Anglican Communion. The two denominations fully accept each other's ministry. Mar Thoma bishops also take part in the Lambeth Conferences. Pastoral care and episcopal oversight for Mar Thoma congregations and dioceses in the Western world, comes from territorial Anglican provinces, on an as-needed basis. In the UK, such a partnership exists with the Church of England, in Ireland with the Church of Ireland, in the US with the Episcopal Church, in Canada with the Anglican Church of Canada and in Australia with the Anglican Church of Australia. In India, their communion partners are the Church of South India and the Church of North India. These three churches work together on various issues as the Communion of Churches in India. One such issue is focusing on transgender rights.

Mar Thoma bishops have acted as co-consecrators in the ordination of Anglican bishops, on a number of occasions. In 1970, Mar Thoma bishop Alexander Mar Theophilus was a co-consecrator, who ordained seven original CNI bishops, as part of the inauguration of the united Church of North India. In 2011, Joseph Mar Thoma participated as co-consecrator, in the episcopal ordination of Thomas K. Oommen of the Church of South India. In 2011, Mar Thoma bishop Euyakim Mar Coorilos participated as co-consecrator, in the episcopal ordination of Dhiloraj Canagasabey of the Church of Ceylon. In 2015, Mar Thoma bishop Geevarghese Mar Theodosius participated as co-consecrator, in the episcopal ordination of Peter Eaton of the Episcopal Church (United States). Female primate Katharine Jefferts Schori was the principal consecrator for this ordination.

Relationship with Malabar Independent Syrian church

There is a historic relationship between Mar Thoma Syrian Church and Malabar Independent Syrian Church, although the doctrinal positions are not mutually accepted in full. Church of Thozhiyoor (Anjoor) and its primates have come in rescue of Malankara church many times. After the demise of Pulikkottil Joseph Dionysious (Mar Thoma X) and Punnathra Geevarghese Dionysious, Kidangan Geevarghese Philoxinos of Thozhiyoor Church reigned as Malankara Metropolitan as per the Royal Proclamation and returned the title back to Malankara Church without any claim after consecrating Punnathra Geevarghese Dionysious and Cheppad Geevarghese mar Dionysious for Malankara church. Similarly in 1863 Malankara Metropolitan Mathews Athanasious defended Thozhiyoor Church as an Independent Syrian Church in Madras High Court against Euyakim Koorilos Design to subordinate the Thozhiyoor Church under Antioch. From that verdict onwards Church of Thozhiyoor came to be known as Malabar Independent Syrian Church. When the Metropolitan Thomas Athanasius died without consecrating a successor in 1893, it was the Metropolitan of the Thozhiyoor Church who consecrated Metropolitan Titus I Mar Thoma, and helped the Mar Thoma Church in a serious crisis. Mar Thoma Metropolitans have since then helped in consecrating the Metropolitans of Thozhiyoor Church and vice versa. According to the constitution of the Thozhiyoor Church, when difficulties arise the Thozhiyoor Church should seek the advice and guidance of the Mar Thoma Metropolitan despite the fact that either Church has no authority over the other. Thus the relation between the Thozhiyoor Church and Mar Thoma Church is unique. The centenary of the fraternal relationship between the two Churches was celebrated in the Sabha Mandalam on 14 September 1994.

Relationship with Syrian Church and the Patriarch of Antioch

Mar Thoma Church has special regards and respect to Syriac Orthodox Church. The Apostolic succession of Mar Thoma Episcopacy, St James liturgy, Ecclesiastical tradition, and order are all from West Syriac Tradition of Antioch. The First Reforming Metropolitan of Malankara Mathews Athanasious was ordained to ecclesiastical orders by Patriarch Elias of Antioch in 1842. After Demise of Mathews Athanasious, the ecclesiastical robe and other insignia were sent to the Patriarch of Antioch as per tradition. It was later returned to Mar Thoma Church during the time of Patriarch Zakka I. Patriarch Ignatius Zakka I and Patriarch Ignatius Aphrem II have visited Maraman Convention and blessed its faithful. Mar Thoma Church has made a convention or practice that it will never consecrate a bishop with the name "Ignatius" the Ecclesiastical Title of Patriarch. Other Malankara churches started consecrating their own Holy Muron, Mar Thoma church still have not done that. Mar Thoma church hitherto has been increasing and using the holy muron Consecrated by Patriarch Elias and brought to Malankara by Mathews Athanasious in 1842. Mar Thoma church maintains good relations with Jacobite Syrian Christian Church. There is an active ecumenical dialogue between the Syrian orthodox church and Mar Thoma Church for mutual acceptance and wider communion.

Relationship with Malankara Orthodox Syrian Church
Malankara Mar Thoma Syrian Church and Malankara Orthodox Syrian Church have the same Malankara antiquity and heritage that dates back to Saint Thomas' mission in Kerala, as well as West Syriac St James liturgical traditions dating back to the Puthenkoor faction. 
These churches are often referred as Swadeshi Churches as both have their spiritual and temporal leaders based within Kerala, India unlike many other Christian Churches of Kerala. However, there is no official Holy communion relationship between both the churches.

At the same time, both clergy and laity come together in matters of social and public concern. 
Ecumenical worship services during Christmas season is common outside Kerala among the diaspora, and also at many places within Kerala.

Marriages between the members of the two Churches are very common given the mutual historical privileged caste status of Kerala Syrian Christian community, although ecclesiastical authorities like to discourage such alliances and may not grant proper documents.
Leaders of both churches have held ecumenical dialogues to discuss their differences in theology, traditions or practices that still remain pending clarification for mutual recognition, joint theological education and research, and communion; such efforts remain ongoing.

There are many church leaders in both the churches who are widely respected across the larger Syrian Christian community, irrespective of their individual affiliation.
Mar Thoma church has established an internal tradition that it will never consecrate an Episcopal or Metropolitan with the Greek name Baselios The ecclesiastical title of Catholicos of Edessa, which is now being used for primates of the Malankara Orthodox Syrian Church( holding the ecclesiastical title of Catholicos of the East) and Jacobite Syrian Christian Church (holding ecclesiastical title of Catholicos of India).
Both Mar Thoma Church and Malankara Orthodox Church believes that their Primates are occupying the Ecclesiastical Throne of St Thomas.

Both churches share church buildings to conduct their worship services at several places such as Chengannur, Koorthamala, Bahrain, Hyderabad etc. with peace and mutual love. These serve as examples of Christian Unity and brotherhood that many other churches can learn from and replicate.

Relationship with STECI, Old Catholic and Lutheran churches
The Mar Thoma Church has concluded its ecumenical dialogue with the Old Catholic Churches of the Union of Utrecht in 2014. This dialogue is in the process of reception. There is an ecumenical dialogue of the Mar Thoma Syrian Church with the Lutheran churches.

Relationship with Eastern Catholic Churches in India
The church maintains friendly relations with the Syro-Malabar Catholic Church and the Syro-Malankara Catholic Church; but the Catholic doctrines are not accepted by Mar Thoma church in their fullness. The Mar Thoma Church keeps a multifaceted approach in these relationships by adapting to the spiritual and cultural environment of the communions yet strongly abiding with the Mar Thoma Syrian identity. The Mar Thoma Church also keeps good ecumenical relations with other Christian churches around the world.

Vestments in the Mar Thoma Syrian Church 
The Mar Thoma Syrian Church is an autonomous Reformed Oriental Church which is based in the state of Kerala in India is spread all across the world. The Mar Thoma Syrian Church has the Liturgical Orders of Deacons or Shemshono's, Priests or Kasheesho's, Monastics and Bishops.

Deacons/Shemshono's 
The first order of priesthood in the Mar Thoma Syrian Church of Malabar is the Order of Diaconate. In most of the other Syrian Churches, there are six official orders of the diaconate, however, in the Mar Thoma Syrian Church, there is only one orders of Diaconate. Deacons are given the mission of assisting the priest or bishop during the Holy Qurbana and is allowed to give the Holy Blood of Jesus Christ from the Casa.

Kuroyo/ Readers/ Altar Boys 
The Mar Thoma Syrian Church is a democratic Church and being a Church that upholds the royal priesthood of all believers. Laymen are designated to assist the priest in worship. These laymen belong to the order of Kuroyo's or reader who has the duty of reading from the Holy Scriptures. These laymen wear a Kutino which is also known as the Shishroosha Kuppayam to symbolise the sanctity of worship. This dress code was a lost practice in the Mar thoma Church which is gaining popularity over the past few years. However, this is not an official order.

Full Deacons 
Full deacons in the Mar Thoma Church are permitted to officially serve in liturgical ceremonies. They assist the priest with the needs of the priest and have the privilege to read the Holy Evengelion, give Qurbana to the faithful, and lead in the Kukyilions. In the Mar Thoma Syrian Church, there are no official liturgical vestments, instead, they wear a white cassock or a Kammees (traditional dress of Malankara Priests).

Priests/Kasheesho's 
Priests wearing the traditional Kammees and white cassock.

Daily Dress. 
Mar Thoma priests are allowed to wear two kinds of casual dress after their ordination. The first one is called a 'Kammees' which is the traditional attire worn by priests of Kerala. The 'Kammes' is a white robe and its length stops above the feet. The Kammees also has a small cape-like cloth which emerges from the back of the Kammees and stops right above the Chest. The Kammees is shaped similar to a cross symbolising that the person wearing the Kammees are Cross bearers for Christ. The second kind of dress which is a long white cassock which was introduced in the Mar Thoma Church in the late 1930s. A black Girdle (a narrow belt) is tied in the middle after wearing cassock symbolizing the steadfastness of their servanthood. There are Mar Thoma Priest who live as monastics called the Dayaraya Samooham. They wear a Khadi colored cassock which shows the Indian roots and also has a cross around their neck.

Liturgical Vestments 
The Liturgical vestments of the priests in the Mar Thoma Syrian Church are very similar to that of the Church in Antioch. These Liturgical vestments are only worn during the performance of a sacrament and is worn after praying different prayers during the Preparatory Service (Thooyaba). The Liturgical Vestments of the Celebrant priest are as follows.

 Msone: These are ceremonial shoes which are worn during the celebration of the Holy Qurbono. Upon wearing the left shoe, the priest recites, "May my feet, O Lord God, be shod with the preparation of the Gospel of peace so that I may tread underfoot serpents and scorpions and all the power of the enemy, forever". Upon wearing the right shoe, he recites, "Cast down under my foot, Lord God, all false pride that is exalted against Thy knowledge, and grant that by Thy help I may bring the lusts of the flesh into subjection, forever."
 Kutino: Kutino or 'alb', a white surplice whose color is an indication of the priest's purity. The priest signs the cross over it three times saying, "Clothe me, O Lord, with the robe of incorruption through the strength of Thy Holy Spirit, and make me worthy to keep the true faith and walk in the paths of purity and righteousness all the days of my life."
 Hamnikho: The Hamnikho or'necklace', is the stole which symbolizes the priest being armed with the fear of the Lord. He signs the cross over it twice, reciting Psalm 18:39, 40: "Gird me with strength unto the battle and subdue under me them that rise up against me, defeat my enemies and silence those who hate me."

Mar Thoma Priest wearing a Black Cassok during a sacramental function.

 Zenoro: Zenoro is a 'girdle' which speaks of the priest's control over all bodily desires. He signs the cross over it once reciting Psalm 45:3: "Gird thy sword upon thy thigh, O thou most mighty with thy splendor and glory. Thy glory triumphs."
 Zendo: Zendo are 'sleeves' which symbolize the priest's readiness to keep God's Law and do works of righteousness. He signs the cross twice over the left sleeve and recites Psalm 18:34 while wearing it: "He trains my hands to war; and he strengthens my arms like a bow of brass". He then signs the cross once over the right sleeve and recites Psalm 18:35 while wearing it: "Let Thy right hand help me up, and let Thy loving discipline raise me."
 Phayno: Phanyno a cope which symbolizes Aaron's robe of many colors and the Savior's seamless robe. He signs the cross over it thrice reciting Psalm 132:9-10: "Let Thy priests be clothed with righteousness and Thy righteous with glory. For Thy servant David's sake, turn not away the face of thine anointed". Then he puts it on reciting Psalm 132:9: "Clothe Thy priests with salvation and Thy saints with glory."

The priests who act as the co celebrants in the Holy Qurbana or any other sacramental function wears a loose black cassock over his casual cassock symbolizing the purity of the sacramental function he is a part of.

Bishops/Episcopa's 
Bishops of the Mar Syrian Church belongs to the Monastic Order. They take a particular pledge or an oath before being consecrated as a monk in the Church. The vestments of the Prelate/Episcopa's are very similar to that of priests along with a few additions,

Daily Dress 
The bishops have long colored cassocks for their daily matters of the Church, Bishops of the Mar Thoma Church wear an 'Eskimo' or a Hood which symbolizes that they are monks. The color of the Cassocks should be either a light Yellow color which is similar to what monks wear in the Indian subcontinent or should be a dark red which upholds the Syrian Tradition.

Liturgical Vestments 

The Episocpa's of the Mar Thoma Syrian Church has very similar vestments to that of the priest along with a few additional vestments. The bishops who are the co-celebrants of the Holy Qurbana or celebrants of all other Sacraments wear a loose black cassock over their casual cassock to symbolise the sanctity of the sacrament being performed.

If the Bishops are the celebrants of the Holy Qurbana Service, they wear the following vestments along with that of a priest:

 Masnamptho: Before wearing the Phayno (Cope), Bishops also puts on the masnaphto or a 'turban', a head-cover which symbolizes the cloth with which the Lord's head was bound for His burial. He makes the sign of the cross twice on it and wears it reciting Psalm 4:6-7: "Who can show me He who is good? May the light of Thy countenance shine upon us, O Lord, Thou hast given gladness to my heart."
 Bathrashil: This vestment is used by the Bishops which is similar to a Hamnikho that priests wear. This is worn after the bishop wears the Phayno. He puts on batrashil 'Pallium' which is similar to the Hamnikho but extends both front and back. It reminds the prelate of the Cross which the Savior carried. He crosses it once reciting Psalm 27:5: "In the day of trouble, he protects me in the shadow of his tabernacle. He exalts me upon a rock; and now he shall lift up my head above mine enemies."
 Cross Necklace: Bishops wear a Cross, around the neck. While wearing the cross he recites Psalm 34:5: "Turn your eyes to him and hope in him and you shall not be disappointed."
 Hand Cross and Crosier: Finally bishop takes the crosier (mooroneetho) in his left hand, which symbolizes the bishop's authority and reminds us of the shepherd's staff, reciting Psalm 110:2: "The Lord will send forth the sceptre of Thy power out of Zion: thou shalt rule in the midst of thine enemies". He also takes a hand Cross in his right hand, from which a cloth called mqablonitho 'veil' is hung reciting Psalm 44:5: "For Thy cause we shall combat our enemies and for the cause of Thy name we shall trample those who hate us."

Liturgical Vestments as per the Malankara Tradition. 
Mar Thoma Syrian Church is among the couple Churches in Malankara which also upholds the ancient Malankara Tradition of the Church. These vestments are mostly worn during the consecration of a new Church or during an Ordination service. These vestments appear very similar to Roman Catholic vestments probably for the reason that the Malankara Church was under Rome for over 150 years from the 1500s to 1653. The vestments include Mitre, Surplice, and Amice

See also

Saint Thomas Christians
Malankara Church
Eastern Protestant Christianity
West Syriac Rite
List of Marthoma Syrian Christians
Saint Thomas Christians
Malankara Syrian Metropolitans
South India Reformed Churches

Notes

References

Sources
In English:
Constitution of Mar Thoma Syrian Church. (2008)
Juhanon Mar Thoma Metropolitan, The Most Rev. Dr. (1952). Christianity in India and a Brief History of the Mar Thoma Syrian Church. Pub: K.M. Cherian.
K. V. Mathew (1985) The Faith and Practice of The Mar Thoma Church.
George Menachery (1973) The St. Thomas Christian Encyclopaedia of India Vol. II.
Mathew N.M. (2003). St. Thomas Christians of Malabar Through Ages, C.S.S. Tiruvalla.  and CN 80303
Pothen, S.G. (1963). The Syrian Christians of Kerala. Asia Publishing House, London.
Zac Varghese Dr. & Mathew A. Kallumpram. (2003). Glimpses of Mar Thoma Church History. London, England. 
Koshy Mathew Karinjapally (2005). Roots and Wings Bangalore, India. 
Cheriyan, Dr. C.V. Orthodox Christianity in India Kottayam2003.

In Malayalam:
Chacko, T.C. (1936) Malankara Marthoma Sabha Charithra Samgraham. (Concise History of Mar Thoma Church), Pub: E.J. Institute, Kompady, Tiruvalla.
Daniel, K.N. (1924) Malankara Sabha Charitravum Upadesangalum, (History and Doctrines of Malankara Church). M.C.Chacko, R.V.Press, Tiruvalla.
Daniel, K.N. (1952). Udayamperoor Sunnahadosinte Canonukal. (Canons of Synod of Diamper) Pub: C.S.S., Tiruvalla.
Eapen, Prof. Dr. K.V. (2001). Malankara Marthoma Suryani Sabha Charitram. (History of Malankara Mar Thoma Syrian Church). Pub: Kallettu, Muttambalam, Kottayam.
George Alexander, Rev. (Ed). Maramon Convention Sathapdhi Valum-'95.
George Kassessa, Rev. M.C. (1919). Palakunnathu Abraham Malpan. (Biography in Malayalam), CLS, Tiruvalla.
Mathews Mar Athanasius Metropolitan. (1857). Mar Thoma Sleehayude Idavakayakunna Malankara Suryani Sabhaudai Canon. (Canon of the Malankara Syrian Church of Saint Thomas). Printed at Kottayam Syrian Seminary.
Mathew, N.M. (2007). Malankara Marthoma Sabha Charitram, (History of the Mar Thoma Church), Volume 1 (2006), Volume II (2007). Volume III (2008) Pub. E.J.Institute, Thiruvalla
Varughese, Rev. K.C., (1972). Malabar Swathantra Suryani Sabhyude Charitram (History of the Malankar Independednt Suryani Church)
Mar Thoma Sabha Directory. (1999) Pub. The Publication Board of The Mar Thoma Church, Tiruvalla, Kerala, India.
P. V. Mathew. Nazrani Christians of Kerala (Malayalam) Vol.2 Kochi, 1993.
Joseph Cheeran, Rev. Dr. Adv. P.C. Mathew (Pulikottil) and K.V. Mammen (Kottackal). Indian Orthodox Church History and Culture. (Malayalam) Kottackal Publishers, Kottayam. 2002.

External links
Official Site of the Malankara Mar Thoma Syrian Church

1852 establishments in British India
Christian denominations in India
 
Members of the National Council of Churches
Members of the World Council of Churches
Saint Thomas Christians
Affiliated institutions of the National Council of Churches in India
Reformed denominations in Asia
Anglicanism in India